Tetragonoderus lindneri is a species of beetle in the family Carabidae. It was described by Emden in 1935.

References

lindneri
Beetles described in 1935